The 2007 Waveney District Council election took place on 3 May 2007 to elect members of Waveney District Council in England. This was on the same day as other local elections.

Summary

Ward results

References

2007 English local elections
May 2007 events in the United Kingdom
2007
2000s in Suffolk